Nemra may refer to:
 Nemra (band), an Armenian rock band
 Casten Nemra (born 1971), Marshallese politician
 Haley Nemra (born 1989), American-born Marshallese track athlete